San Liberatore a Maiella is an abbey and church in the territory of Serramonacesca, in the province of Pescara, region of Abruzzo, Italy.

History
The origin of the abbey is traditionally linked to Charlemagne, who is portrayed in a fresco fragment within the church. The 9th century edifice was rebuilt a first time from 1007 by the Benedictine monk St. Theobald.  It is dedicated to St. Liberator.

The current edifice, however, is that rebuilt starting from 1080 by Desiderius, abbot of Montecassino.

The church remained in a decaying state until it was restored in 1967-1971.

Architecture

The abbey has a white façade with balanced volumes, flanked by a square-plan bell tower with three floors, having (starting from the lowest) single, double and triple mullioned windows. The façade has vertical relief in Lombard-Romanesque styles.

The interior is on the basilica plan with a nave and two aisles, divided by seven round arcades with triangular piers.

The triumphal arches (the central one is now missing) led to the presbytery. The arches are supported by cruciform pilasters which end with notable decorations, in a style similar to that of the nave's walls. The ceiling has wooden trusses. In the left aisles are the former accesses to the cloister and the monastery residential quarters, represented by two decorated doors. One has in its tympanum the typical flower motif of the Abruzzese Romanesque style.

The nave's pavement has a rare pavement geometrical decoration which dates from c. 1200.

The apse has frescoes from various ages, once united but now, after their restoration, separated: the one portraying Theobald in from the 16th century, while the second, with traces of saints' figures, is from the 12th century.

The ambo has a square shape, and is similar to those in the San Clemente Abbey of Casauria and in that of San Pelino at Corfinio.

References

This article is a translation of the corresponding Italian article on it.wikipedia.org. See references given there.

Monasteries in Abruzzo
Churches in the province of Pescara
11th-century Roman Catholic church buildings in Italy
Christian monasteries established in the 11th century
Romanesque architecture in Abruzzo
Buildings and structures in the Province of Pescara